Khalid Heydari (born 1950 in Mahabad – September 22, 1980 Kut Iraq) was an Iranian Air Force F-4 Phantom pilot during the Iran/Iraq War.

Operation Revenge (in Persian known as Entegham) or (Alpha Red) 
He participated in strategic operation "Revenge" or in Persian "Entegham", an attack on Iraqi tactical air force to verify whether Iran's air force capabilities.

The attack took place on September 30, 1980, from 14 to 16 pm. The pilots were all volunteers.

The First Division was led by Major Jahangir flying Abnymyn called "Alborz" out of Bushehr air base.

The Second Division, called Alpha Flight Red "Red alpha red-alpha", was led by Maj. Syed Jalil Purrezayi of Hamedan air base. The first bombs landed on air bases in Kut.

Lost 
Khaled Heydari's plane was hit by a surface-to-air missile and crashed in the Tigris River. Heydari was declared missing.

Found 
After years of exploration in 2012 in a body in a Kut cemetery was found. Following a ceremony the body of Khaled Heydari was transferred to his home town of Mahabad, where he was buried. Dredging in the Tigris River carcass found the collapsed Lfard aircraft operations.

References 

Iranian aviators
Iranian military personnel killed in the Iran–Iraq War
Aviators killed by being shot down
Islamic Republic of Iran Air Force personnel
1950 births
1980 deaths
Iranian Sunni Muslims